In baseball, a pull hitter is a batter who usually hits the ball to the side of the field from which he bats.  For example, a right-handed pull hitter, who bats from the left side of the plate, will usually hit the ball to the left side of the field, termed "left field", from the batter's perspective.  The opposite of pull hitting is known as "hitting to the opposite field."  Hitters who rarely hit to the opposite field or "up the middle" are often described as dead pull hitters.

Shifting

When a pull hitter with a high batting average is at the plate, it is common for the manager of the defensive team to implement the defensive tactic known as "shifting," moving one or more infielders or outfielders to the side of the field to which the batter usually hits, with the number of moved players being proportional to the increase in likelihood of the batter's hitting to that side of the field.  For a left-handed power hitter such as the Chicago White Sox' Harold Baines or the Boston Red Sox' Ted Williams, a full "shift" involves placing the third baseman in the shortstop's normal position; the shortstop between the first and second basemen, usually in shallow right field; the left fielder in left-center or center field; and the center fielder in right-center field.  Conversely, managers often call for the opposite shift when a strong right-handed pull hitter is at bat for the opposing team. With more batter tendency data being provided to major league clubs, coaches, and managers about what batters usually do with balls that they put in play, the number of plays which involve a shift have increased drastically, from around 3,000 in 2010 to about 33,000 in 2017.

See also
 Baseball positioning

References

Batting (baseball)
Baseball strategy
Baseball terminology
Handedness in baseball